The Suite in C minor, BWV 997, by Johann Sebastian Bach, exists in two versions:
 BWV 997.1 – 1st version, composed before its earliest extant manuscript copy was written 1738–1741, for Lautenwerk (lute-harpsichord)
 BWV 997.2 – 2nd version, for lute: the arrangement is not by Bach.

Movements

It has five movements:
Preludio
Fuga
Sarabande
Gigue
Double (variation on the gigue) – If the double is counted as a separate movement.

References

External links

Suites by Johann Sebastian Bach
1737 compositions